The Amaravati Archaeological Museum is a museum located in Amaravati, a village in Guntur district of the Indian state of Andhra Pradesh. It is running by Andhra Pradesh tourism. It opens at morning 10:00 and closed at 5:00 pm and Friday holiday. It also consists modal of Amaravathi Mahachaitya.

Gallery

See also 
 List of museums in India

References

External links 

Archaeological museums in India
Museums in Andhra Pradesh
Buildings and structures in Guntur district
Amaravati
Year of establishment missing